Limousine liberal and latte liberal are pejorative U.S. political terms used to illustrate hypocritical behavior by political liberals of upper class or upper middle class status. The label stems primarily from unwillingness of limousine liberals to practice the views they purport to uphold, e.g. calling for the use of public transportation while frequently using privately owned luxury transportation, especially by limousines or private jets in the case of the extremely affluent, claiming environmental consciousness but driving fuel inefficient vehicles, or ostensibly supporting public education while sending their children to exclusive private schools with high tuition fees.

Formation and early use

Procaccino campaign
Democratic New York City mayoral hopeful Mario Procaccino coined the term "limousine liberal" to describe incumbent  Mayor John Lindsay and his wealthy Manhattan backers during a heated 1969 campaign. Historian David Callahan says that Procaccino:

It was a populist and producerist epithet, carrying an implicit accusation that the people it described were insulated from all negative consequences of their programs purported to benefit the poor and that the costs and consequences of such programs would be borne in the main by working class or lower middle class people who were not so poor as to be beneficiaries themselves. In particular, Procaccino criticized Lindsay for favoring unemployed minorities, ex. blacks and Hispanics, over working-class white ethnics.

One Procaccino campaign memo attacked "rich super-assimilated people who live on Fifth Avenue and maintain some choice mansions outside the city and have no feeling for the small middle class shopkeeper, home owner, etc. They preach the politics of confrontation and condone violent upheaval in society because they are not touched by it and are protected by their courtiers". The Independent later stated that "Lindsay came across as all style and no substance, a 'limousine liberal' who knew nothing of the concerns of the same 'silent majority' that was carrying Richard Nixon to the White House at the very same time."

Later use
In the 1970s, the term was applied to wealthy liberal supporters of open-housing and forced school busing who did not make use of either of these themselves. In Boston, Massachusetts, supporters of busing, such as Senator Ted Kennedy, sent their children to private schools and lived in affluent suburbs. To some South Boston residents, Kennedy's support of a plan that "integrated" their children with blacks and his apparent unwillingness to do the same with his own children, was hypocrisy.

By the late 1990s and early 21st century, the term has also come to be applied to those who support environmentalist or "green" goals, such as mass transit, yet drive large SUVs or literally have a limousine and driver. Sam Dealey, writing in The Weekly Standard, applied the term to Sheila Jackson-Lee for being "routinely chauffeured the one short block to work—in a government car, by a member of her staff, at the taxpayers' expense." The term was also used disparagingly in a 2004 episode of Law & Order by Fred Thompson's character, Arthur Branch, to criticize the politics and beliefs of his more liberal colleague, Serena Southerlyn. South Park'''s creators Trey Parker and Matt Stone poked fun at the tendency of some liberals to be more concerned with image than actually helping the earth in the episode "Smug Alert!".The New York Observer applied the term to 2008 Democratic presidential candidate John Edwards for paying $400 for a haircut and, according to the newspaper, "lectures about poverty while living in gated opulence".

In 2009, the term was applied by some commentators to former Senate Majority Leader and then-Barack Obama cabinet appointee Tom Daschle for failing to pay back taxes and interest on the use of a limousine service.|

Civil rights leader Al Sharpton used the term latte liberal to criticize (mostly white and high-income) left-leaning people "sit[ing] around the Hamptons" who advocated for the Defund the police movement and ignored the concerns of African-Americans that suffer under high crime rates and rely on a strong police force.

See alsoBobos in ParadiseBoba liberal
Champagne socialist 
Chattering class
Gauche caviar
Liberal elite
Radical chic

References

Further reading
 Francia, Peter L., et al. "Limousine liberals and corporate conservatives: The financial constituencies of the democratic and republican parties." Social Science Quarterly 86.4 (2005): 761–778.
 Fraser, Steve. The Limousine Liberal: How an Incendiary Image United the Right and Fractured America (Basic, 2016). viii, 291 pp.
 Stark, Andrew. "Limousine liberals, welfare conservatives: On belief, interest, and inconsistency in democratic discourse." Political Theory'' 25.4 (1997): 475–501.

External links

Class-related slurs
Liberalism
Upper class
Political metaphors referring to people
Political terminology of the United States
Political slurs